Balcerzak is a surname of Polish-language origin. Notable people with the surname include:

John Balcerzak, American police officer
Patrycja Balcerzak (born 1994), Polish footballer
Piotr Balcerzak (born 1975), Polish sprinter

Polish-language surnames